In a Flesh Aquarium is the second full-length album by Canadian avant-garde extreme metal band uneXpect. It was released on August 22, 2006 through The End Records. This is the first album to include Landryx as the new drummer and the last album to feature Le Bateleur on violin.

SyriaK wrote all lyrics, except "Megalomaniac Trees" by Artagoth and "The Shiver" by ChaotH. The lyrics to "Another Dissonant Chord" were translated to Hungarian by the Hegyesy family (relatives of Leïlindel); the booklet also includes the English translation.

The album was re-released in Europe in 2007 by Ascendance Records and distributed worldwide by Plastic Head, with a different album cover and also including the 2003 release wE, Invaders as a bonus CD, which includes a bonus track entitled "Puppet's Strange Vision" composed by ExoD.

Track listing
In a Flesh Aquarium
All lyrics by SyriaK, all music by UnexpecT  (unless otherwise noted).
"Chromatic Chimera" – 5:52
"Feasting Fools" – 6:17
"Desert Urbania" – 7:30
"Summoning Scenes" – 7:47
"Silence 011010701" – 5:14 (music: ExoD)
"Megalomaniac Trees" – 5:57 (lyrics: Artagoth)
"The Shiver - Another Dissonant Chord" – 3:00
"The Shiver - Meet Me at the Carrousel" – 4:08
"The Shiver - A Clown's Mindtrap" – 3:41
"Psychic Jugglers" – 11:10

Personnel
Leïlindel – vocals
SyriaK – vocals, guitar, piano on "Psychic Juggle"
Artagoth – vocals, guitar
ExoD – keyboard, piano, sampling
Le Bateleur – violin
ChaotH – 7- and 9-stringed bass guitar
Landryx – drums

Guest musicians
Amélie Blanchette – clarinet on "Psychic Juggle"
Nathalie Duchesne – additional violin and cello on "Summoning Scenes", "The Shiver", and "Psychic Juggle"
Stéphanie Colerette – additional violin and cello on "Summoning Scenes", "The Shiver", and "Psychic Juggle"
Benjamin Proulx-Mathers – saxophone on "Megalomaniac Trees"

Production
Produced By UnexpecT
Engineered, Mixed & Mastered By Serge Cossette

References

Unexpect albums
2006 albums
The End Records albums